Joan Stambaugh (born 10 June 1932 ; † 7. July 2013) was an American philosopher and professor of philosophy at City University of New York. She is known for her translations of the works of Martin Heidegger.

Work 
She worked with Heidegger directly when she was a student and was a friend to Freiburg i. B. Professor Ute Guzzoni as well as William J. Richardson, S.J. and Manfred Frings. She was an interpreter and translator of Martin Heidegger's writings. She was known for her work on Eastern philosophy as well as her work on the philosophy of time.  She was also influential in Nietzsche studies. In addition, she was known for her translation of Being and Time into English.

Publications
 The Formless Self (Albany: SUNY Press, 1999).
 The Other Nietzsche (Albany: SUNY Press, 1994).
 The Finitude of Being (Albany: State University of New York Press, 1992).
 Impermanence is Buddha-Nature: Dogen's Understanding of Temporality (The University of Hawaii Press, 1990).
 The Real is Not the Rational (Albany: SUNY Press, 1986).
 Translator of Martin Heidegger, Being and Time (Albany: SUNY Press, 1996).
 Translator of Martin Heidegger, Identity and Difference (Chicago: University of Chicago Press, 2002). reissued
 Translator of Martin Heidegger, On Time and Being (Chicago: University of Chicago Press, 2002). reissued
 Translator of Martin Heidegger, The End of Philosophy (Chicago: University of Chicago Press, 2002). reissued

See also
Nietzsche and Asian Thought
Dennis J. Schmidt

References

Further reading
 Heidegger, Translation, and the Task of Thinking: Essays in Honor of Parvis Emad, Frank Schalow (ed.), Springer, 2011

20th-century American philosophers
21st-century American philosophers
Continental philosophers
Existentialists
Philosophy academics
Heidegger scholars
German–English translators
20th-century translators
21st-century translators
Translators of philosophy
Translators of Martin Heidegger
City University of New York faculty
Graduate Center, CUNY faculty
1932 births
2013 deaths
Nietzsche scholars